Atibaia (or Estância de Atibaia) is a Brazilian municipality in the state of São Paulo, Brazil. The name is derived from an indigenous language called Tupi, and means "healthy water river". Its name has changed over time, from the primitive Tupi word Tybaia, to Thibaia, Atubaia, Thibaya, and finally the city's modern name, Atibaia.

Its strawberry crops are well known. These crops are cultivated mainly by Japanese descendants, since the city was a common Japanese immigrant center.

History
In 1665, Jerônimo de Camargo and his expedition found a hill near a river named Tubaia (later called Atibaia River). Jerônimo de Camargo was a Bandeirante explorer. Their main objective was to search the interior lands of Brazil for rich mineral resources, such as gold, silver and emeralds in present-day state of Minas Gerais.

Camargo had his men build a chapel by the Tubaia river, which served as shelter to "tropeiros"—interior explorers on horse back—as well. The area was already occupied by Mateus Nunes da Siqueira, a priest who established contact with the Guarulhos tribe.

In June 1665, a farm was established and Father Mateus built a village with the help of enslaved natives. The village was called Atibaia.

Atibaia was a very important settlement at that time, because it was part of the route to Minas Gerais. São Paulo, probably the second most important city in Brazil at that time, was south of Atibaia, and the mining region north of it, locating Atibaia midway between those two important points.

As time passed, Atibaia became very important. Even the king of Portugal, D. João VI, visited the small town. Many famous artists lived in or visited Atibaia, such as Benedito Calixto, a famous church fresco painter. The city boasts two of his paintings. Alberto Santos-Dumont, the father of aviation, also visited Atibaia.

In April 1864, Atibaia was officially promoted to the status of city, due to the increased size of its population.

An important thoroughfare that divides the city is now called Avenida Jerônimo de Camargo.

The correct denomination for the native people is "atibaiano"; "atibaiense" is the nomination for those who live there but weren't born in the city.

Geography
Atibaia is located 64 km north-east of São Paulo and 88 km south-east of Campinas two major urban centres in the region.

The city is located on a strategic highway crossing: the junction of Rodovia D. Pedro I and Rodovia Fernão Dias, having direct access to important cities, such as São Paulo, Belo Horizonte, Campinas and Jacareí.

Atibaia has 478 square kilometers of area, 40% of this area is urbanized. The average altitude is 800 meters.

Demographics
According to the census of 2007, executed by the Brazilian Institute of Geography and Statistics (IBGE), Atibaia has approximately 119,166 inhabitants. However, 30,000 of these are people who own land or summer homes in the city, but do not reside there.
Atibaia have a Gini index average = 0.43 according to 2007 IBGE data.
 
There is not great industrial activity in Atibaia, and so there is a huge labour offer. According to the IBGE census, 65% of the population (95,342 inhabitants) is part of the economically active age group.

Economy
In 2005, The Brazilian Development Bank (BNDES) loaned Atibaia R$2 million, to try to help it improve its city hall management. The funds will be invested in information technology; human resource qualification; specialized technical services; equipment to support tax auditing; and infrastructure.

Sites of interest
There is a museum in Atibaia called the "Museu João Batista Conti". Begun in 1954, it contains arms, armor, furniture, historical objects, coins and works of religious art along with important documents on the colonial and imperial periods in Brazil.

Atibaia also has an evangelic seminary of the Word of Life organization or as known in Portuguese "Palavra da Vida". SBPV - Seminário Bíblico Palavra da Vida, founded in 1965, is located on the outskirts of Atibaia.

Neighboring towns
-Mairiporã

-Bom Jesus dos Perdões

-Bragança Paulista

-Jarinu

-Condominio do Regis (EPA)

-Piracaia

Sister cities
  Goyang, Gyeonggi Province, South Korea

References

External links
 City Hall website 
 

Municipalities in São Paulo (state)
Populated places established in 1665